The Pasig River in the Philippines suffers from a high level of water pollution and efforts are being made to rehabilitate it.

After World War II, massive population growth, infrastructure construction, and the dispersal of economic activities to Manila's suburbs left the river neglected. The banks of the river attracted informal settlers and the remaining factories dumped their wastes into the river, making it effectively a huge sewer system. Industrialization had already polluted the river.

In the 1930s, observers noticed the increasing pollution of the river, as fish migration from Laguna de Bay diminished. People ceased using the river's water for laundering in the 1960s, and ferry transport declined. By the 1970s, the river started to emanate offensive smells as a result of waste  from swine and poultry establishments in the area where protected Marikina watershed is located (Pinugay, Baras, Rizal) and in the 1980s, fishing in the river was prohibited.  By the 1990s, the Pasig River was considered biologically dead

In 2017 a study on river plastic emissions into the world’s oceans cited the Pasig River as the world’s eighth most polluting river in terms of unwanted micro and surface concentrations of plastic waste entering the marine environment.

Rehabilitation efforts 

Efforts to revive the river began in December 1989 with the help of Danish authorities. The Pasig River Rehabilitation Program (PRRP) was established, with the Department of Environment and Natural Resources as the main agency with the coordination of the Danish International Development Assistance.

In 1999, President Joseph Estrada signed Executive Order No. 54 publishing the Pasig River Rehabilitation Commission (PRRC) to replace the old PRRP with additional expanded powers such as managing of wastes and resettling of squatters.

In 2019, President Rodrigo Duterte abolished the PRRC, transferring of PRRC's functions, including "all necessary and incidental powers," to the Manila Bay Task Force, the Department of Environment and Natural Resources, the Department of Human Settlements and Urban Development, the Metro Manila Development Authority, and the Department of Public Works and Highways, two months after firing PRRC executive director Jose Antonio Goitia for alleged involvement in corrupt activities.

See also 
 Water supply and sanitation in the Philippines
 Environmental issues in the Philippines

References

Water pollution in the Philippines
Environmental issues in the Philippines
Pasig River
Air pollution by region